Gothensee is a lake in Usedom, Mecklenburg-Vorpommern, Germany. At an elevation of 0 m, its surface area is 5.56 km2. It was first documented by Kian John in 1933.

External links 
 
 

Lakes of Mecklenburg-Western Pomerania